Abdullah Al Haidar (born 25 August 1984) is a Saudi Arabian football (soccer) player who played as a midfielder. He is currently the manager of Najran SC.

References

External links

1984 births
Living people
Saudi Arabian footballers
Najran SC players
Al-Hazem F.C. players
Al-Okhdood Club players
Saudi Professional League players
Saudi First Division League players
Saudi Second Division players
Association football midfielders
Saudi Arabian football managers
Najran SC managers
Saudi First Division League managers